Drawn thread work is one of the earliest forms of open work embroidery, and has been worked throughout Europe. Originally it was often used for ecclesiastical items and to ornament shrouds. It is a form of counted-thread embroidery based on removing threads from the warp and/or the weft of a piece of even-weave fabric. 
The remaining threads are grouped or bundled together into a variety of patterns. The more elaborate styles of drawn thread work use a variety of other stitches and techniques, but the drawn thread parts are their most distinctive element. It is also grouped with whitework embroidery because it was traditionally done in white thread on white fabric and is often combined with other whitework techniques.

History 
Drawn thread embroidery is a very early form of open work embroidery, and is the basis of lace. Drawn thread work from the 12th century was known as Opus Tiratum and Punto Tirato from the Arab Tiraz workshops in Palermo. Forms of drawn thread work were known and created throughout Europe, often for ecclesiastical purposes or to decorate shrouds. Early examples have been found in which the work is done on linen so fine that magnification is needed to see the work.

Styles

Basic hemstitching
The simplest kind of drawn thread work is hemstitching, which is often used to decorate the trimmings of clothes or household linens. The transition from elaborate hemstitching to more advanced styles of drawn thread work is not clearly defined.

Needle-weaving
This relatively easy type of drawn thread work is created by weaving (or darning) the embroidering thread into the laid warp or weft threads to create patterns of light-colored threads and dark openings in the drawn-thread cloth. Needleweaving is most often used for decorative borders. It is nearly always used in combination with other types of embroidery stitches. Together they create a complete design and, historically, in ethnic embroidery, distinctive embroidery styles, also known as "needle-darning."

Poltava-style drawnwork
In Ukrainian and some other Slavic languages, merezhka is the general term for "drawn-thread" work. It includes all types of drawn-thread work including those mentioned in the paragraphs above.

The term myreschka, a variant of merezhka, began to be used in some circles for a specific Ukrainian drawn-thread technique that is traditionally used in the central lands of Ukraine, especially in the regions of Poltava and Kyiv, and areas along the Dniepro (Dnieper) River, and some have come to call it "Poltava-style" merezhka. The technique has its own descriptive name in the Ukrainian language, which might be translated into English as "layerings".

The technique for doing Poltava-style "layerings"-merezhka basically involves withdrawing sets of parallel threads of weft while leaving others in place, then using the antique hem-stitch (called prutyk) and this special "layerings" technique to create both the openwork "net" and the design of embroidering threads upon the "withdrawn" part of cloth. The designs which can be created in this way can be simple and narrow, or as complex and wide (high) as any one-colored embroidery design.

Prutyk (may also be spelled prutik) is the "bunch" (switch or stick) that is created when you pull together each bunch of three threads together using hem-stitch. 
In Ukrainian, prutyk is simply another name for "simple hemstitch" (i.e.: merezhka-prutyk), or it can mean each tiny "bunch" in the hemstitching.

Other drawn-thread

A form of double-drawnwork, where both warp and weft are removed at regular intervals, consists of wrapping the remaining threads into "bundles", using embroidery thread to secure them, thus creating something similar to a net. Then embroidery threads are woven in patterns into that net using needle weaving or needle darning. The result is a pattern of the design in white (or colored, depending on ethnic region) embroidery on the "openwork" background of netted cloth.

Cutwork

Hardanger

Hardanger embroidery is a style of drawn thread work that is most popular today. It originally comes from Norway, from the traditional district of Hardanger. The backbone of Hardanger designs consists of satin stitches. In geometrical areas both warp and weft threads are removed and the remaining mesh is secured with simple weaving or warping or with a limited number of simple filling patterns. The designs tend to be geometric, if they include flowers or such they are very stylized due to the nature of the technique. Hardanger never includes Buttonhole stitches, except for securing the edges of a piece of fabric. It is usually executed using rather coarse fabric and thread.

Ukrainian cutwork
Much like Hardanger, Ukrainian cutwork belongs to the category of 'cut-and-drawn' work, since, unlike merezhka (drawn-work), threads of the ground cloth are cut both vertically and horizontally and thus create specifically larger cut-work openings in the body of the fabric, when compared with drawn-work.
The Ukrainian word for cutwork embroidery is vyrizuvannya (pronounced veree-zoo-van-nya - translates into "cutwork").
There are several styles of Ukrainian cutwork, one of which closely resembles Hardanger cutwork.

Needlelace and drawn-thread work
Reticella lace is a form of embroidery in which typical techniques of needlelace are used to embellish drawn thread work. It was first used in 16th century Italy. Needlelace evolved from this when the lacemakers realized that they can do the same things without any supporting fabric. High quality reticella is done with thread almost as thin as sewing silk. Ruskin lace is in fact a near-modern form of it. Warp and weft threads are removed, and the remaining threads are overcast with buttonhole stitches, as in needlelace.

Another embroidery style that combines drawn thread work with needlelace techniques is Hedebo from Denmark, which originates from the area around Copenhagen and Roskilde. It uses techniques that are clearly distinct from reticella and traditional Italian needlelace on the one hand and Hardanger on the other. It does make extensive use of buttonhole stitches, but they are done slightly differently than in Italian embroidery.

References

"Ruskin Lace" by Elizabeth Prickett
Merezhka embroidery at Vetty Creations

Sources
Thérèse de Dillmont, Encyclopedia of Needlework
Tania Diakiw O'Neill, Ukrainian Embroidery Techniques 1984 USA
Nancy R. Ruryk, ed, Ukrainian Embroidery Designs and Stitches 1958 Canada
Yvette Stanton, "Ukrainian Drawn Thread Embroidery: Merezhka Poltavska" 2007 Australia

External links

"How To: Basic Reticella Lace" at Needlearts.com
"How To: Hedebo Embroidery" at Needlearts.com

Embroidery